The 1 Litre Brennabor  Typ C   is a small car introduced by Brennabor in 1931.   In the wake of a sustained period of economic difficulties it represented a belated extension of the company’s range into the "small car" sector which hitherto Brennabor had ignored.   In 1933 the car was upgraded and became the short-lived Brennabor  Typ D   

The Typ C was powered by a newly developed 4-cylinder 1 litre side-valve engine of 3.4 litres, mounted ahead of the driver and delivering 20 hp at 2,800 rpm.  Power was delivered to the rear wheels through a single plate dry clutch and a three-speed gear box controlled using a centrally positioned floor-mounted gear stick.

The car sat on a U-profile pressed steel chassis with rigid axles and semi-elliptical leaf springing.   It was offered as a two-door sedan/saloon, a two-door cabriolet or a two-day roadster, in every case with a 2+2 seating configuration.   The mechanically linked foot brake operated directly on all four wheels, while the handbrake operated on the rear wheels.

In the two years before the appearance of an upgraded model only about 1,000 Typ Cs were sold.

The concept was reworked and the car appeared as the Brennabor Typ D in 1933, now slightly longer than before and with a higher compression ratio which correlated with a 2 hp power increase.   The Typ D shared its predecessor’s fate in the market place, however, and was not a commercial success.   Approximately a further 1,000 of Brennabor’s 1 litre cars were sold as Typ Ds before the company’s decision, towards the end of 1933, to abandon automobile production.

Technical data

Sources 
Oswald, Werner: Deutsche Autos 1920–1945, Motorbuch Verlag Stuttgart, 10. Auflage (1996), 

Brennabor vehicles